Biodemography and Social Biology is a semiannual peer-reviewed academic journal covering the intersection between biology, demography, and sociology. The journal is devoted to "furthering the discussion, advancement, and dissemination of knowledge about biological and sociocultural forces interacting to affect the structure, health, well-being and behavior of human populations". The journal aims to contribute to the fields of both sociobiology and biodemography. It was established in 1916 and is published by Routledge on behalf of the Society for Biodemography and Social Biology, of which it is the official journal. The editor-in-chief is Hiroaki Matsuura (Shoin University). According to the Journal Citation Reports, the journal has a 2019 impact factor of 1.200.

History
Biodemography and Social Biology was first established in 1916 as Eugenical News. It was published under that title until 1953, during which time it was "the primary source of eugenic-related events and news in the United States". It was renamed Eugenics Quarterly in 1954, when it was launched by the American Eugenics Society as a scholarly journal focused on eugenics and related subjects. It was renamed Social Biology in 1969, as a result of the term "eugenics" falling out of fashion. It was renamed again to its current title in 2008.

Notable studies
Henry, Louis (1961) “Some data on natural fertility,” Eugenics Quarterly 8: 81–91.

Past Editors
 Frederick Osborn (Various affiliations), Chairman (1954-1968) 
 Dudley Kirk (Stanford University), Chairman (1968) 
 Richard H. Osborne (University of Wisconsin–Madison), Editor (1961-1977) 
 Arthur Falek (Emory University), Editor (1977-1980) 
 Richard H. Osborne (University of Wisconsin–Madison), Editor (1981-1999) 
 Kenneth Land (Duke University), Editor (1999-2008) 
 Tim B. Heaton (Brigham Young University) / Ken R. Smith (University of Utah), Editor (2008-2012)  
 Eileen M. Crimmins (University of Southern California), Editor (2013-2021)

References

External links

Publications established in 1916
Human biology journals
Sociology journals
Demography journals
Sociobiology
Biannual journals
Routledge academic journals
English-language journals